WIQQ (102.1 FM) in Greenville, Mississippi, a radio station known as "Q102", broadcasts a Top 40/Pop music format. WIQQ is licensed to Leland, Mississippi, United States.  Studios and offices are located at 830 Main Street in Greenville, Mississippi.  The station is currently owned by Delta Radio Network LLC.

History 
WIQQ, known as "Q102", signed on August 31, 1985 and has been programming Top 40/Pop since its inception. The original owner, River Broadcasting Inc. (George Pine and Jimmy Karr) sold the station to Debut Broadcasting in 2007. Delta Radio Network LLC acquired the station on April 1, 2010.

References

External links
Q102 Website

IQQ
Radio stations established in 1986
1986 establishments in Mississippi
Contemporary hit radio stations in the United States